The 2016 Cadet World Championship were held in San Isidro Buenos Aires, Argentina between 26 December 2016 and 4 January 2017.

Podium

External links
 http://www.cadetworld2016.com.ar/ 

Cadet World Championship
Sailing competitions in Argentina
 Sports competitions in Buenos Aires
Cadet World Championships